André-Pierre Nouvion (born 1939) is a French lawyer and historian of French law.

Life and career 
He specializes in consular law and has published reference books on law and history of the consular institutions (Chamber of Commerce and Industry in France and Commercial Court).

Former Director of Chamber of Commerce and Industry, he defended the French model of Chambers of Commerce including during missions under the aegis of the United Nations (UN) with the Cambodian (1995) and Mexican (1998) authorities.

His work has been used by the French Parliamentary Commission in charge of preparing the 2010 reform of the Chambers of Commerce and Industry. 

André-Pierre Nouvion is a Doctor of Law and Political Science (Panthéon-Assas University) and a former auditor of the Institute of Higher National Defense Studies (fr:Institut des hautes études de défense nationale).

His father Henri Nouvion was a researcher specializing in the treatment of tuberculosis who was responsible for important works until 1965, and his grandfather, Léon Faure, a technical adviser to Mustafa Kemal Atatürk, first president of the Turkish Republic.

Publications
 Une histoire immédiate des Chambres de commerce, Droit, Pratique de l'Institution Consulaire : 1982-2012 Des accords "Netter" aux lois de refondation - Paris, 2013 - 
 Pratique et droit des Chambres de commerce et d'industrie françaises, Lexique raisonné - vol.3 : Réforme 2010 - Paris, 2011 - 
 Trois familles en Périgord-Limousin dans la tourmente de la Révolution et de L'Empire : Nouvion, Besse-Soutet-Dupuy et Chassériau - Paris, 2007 - 
 Chambres de commerce et d'industrie - Encyclopédie juridique Dalloz - Répertoire de droit commercial - Paris, 2005
 Pratique et droit des Chambres de commerce et d'industrie françaises - Réforme 2004-2005 - Paris, 2004 - 
 Origine et histoire des juridictions consulaires et des Chambres de commerce et d'industrie Françaises - Paris, 2002 - 
 Chambres de commerce et d'industrie - Encyclopédie juridique Dalloz - Répertoire de droit commercial - Paris, 1999
 L' institution des Chambres de commerce : pouvoirs et contrepoids - Librairie générale de droit et de jurisprudence (LGDJ) - Paris, 1992 -

Award 
 History Award (1992) from the Assembly of French Chambers of Commerce and Industry (ACFCI)

Notes

External links 
L'Inter consulaire - National journal of the French Chambers of commerce and industry, June 2005
[http://www.acfci.cci.fr/histoireconsulaire/PHCpalmares.htm Prix d'Histoire Consulaire remis tous les deux ans - Palmarès - Assemblée des Chambres Françaises de Commerce et d'Industrie (ACFCI)]
 Bicentennial of the French Commercial Code 1807-2007: Les actes du colloque Études, mélanges, travaux'' by Catherine Delplanque, Éditions Dalloz, 2008

20th-century French lawyers
20th-century French historians
1939 births
Living people
Writers from Paris
Paris 2 Panthéon-Assas University alumni
French male non-fiction writers
Chassériau family
21st-century French historians